Clement Thompson (born 6 April 1956) is a Jamaican cricketer. He played in twenty first-class and fourteen List A matches for the Jamaican cricket team from 1976 to 1985.

See also
 List of Jamaican representative cricketers

References

External links
 

1956 births
Living people
Jamaican cricketers
Jamaica cricketers
People from Saint Thomas Parish, Jamaica